Chinese people in Japan include any people self-identifying as ethnic Chinese or people possessing Chinese citizenship living in Japan. People aged 22 or older cannot possess dual-citizenship in Japan, so Chinese possessing Japanese citizenship typically no longer possess Chinese citizenship. The term "Chinese people" typically refers to the Han Chinese, the main ethnic group living in China (PRC) (including Hong Kong and Macau SARs), Taiwan (ROC) and Singapore. Officially, China (PRC) is home to 55 additional ethnic minorities, including people such as Tibetans, though these people might not self-identify as Chinese. Han Chinese people have had a long history in Japan as a minority.

Population and distribution 
Most Chinese people, or descendants of Chinese immigrants, who are living in Japan reside in major cities such as Osaka, Yokohama, and Tokyo, although there are increasingly also significant populations in other areas as government immigration policies increasingly attract workers to 'training programs', universities seek increasing numbers of international students and Chinese people see business opportunities. Japan's first recognised Chinatown was in Nagasaki, developing in the 1680s when economic prerogatives meant that the shogunate needed to restrict and control trade to a greater extent than previously. Before this, there had been a large number of Chinese communities in the west of the country, made up of pirates, merchants, and people who fitted into both categories. In the 19th century, the well-known Chinatowns of Yokohama and Kobe developed, and they are still thriving today, although the majority of Chinese people in Japan live outside Chinatowns in the regular community. The communities are served by Chinese schools that teach the Chinese language.
The Chinese community has undergone a dramatic change since the PRC allowed more freedom of movement of its citizens, but citizens of Taiwan (ROC), Singapore and Hong Kong nationality are not counted in these figures. A study that was conducted in 1995 estimated that the Chinese population of Japan numbered 150,000, among whom between 50,000 and 100,000 could speak Chinese. In 2000, Japanese governmental statistics revealed that there were 335,575 Chinese people in Japan. Current demographic statistics reveal that these numbers have reached over 600,000 legal immigrants, although there is probably also a significant population, although of unknown number, of undocumented immigrants. A significant number of Chinese people take Japanese citizenship each year and therefore disappear from these figures. As Japanese citizenship, like France, does not record ethnicity, once a person has naturalised, they are simply Japanese, so the category of Chinese-Japanese does not exist in the same way as it would in a country which recognises ethnicity. Therefore, the numbers of Japanese people who are of Chinese descent is unclear.

History

Pre-modern era 
It is believed that a substantial component of the Yayoi people migrated from China to Japan. The Yayoi people who introduced wet rice cultivation to Japan may have come from Jiangnan near the Yangtze River Delta in ancient China. This is supported by archeological research and bones found in modern southeastern China and western Japan. According to several Japanese historians, the Yayoi and their ancestors, the Wajin, originated in the today Yunnan province in southern China. Suwa Haruo considered Wa-zoku (Wajin) to be part of the Baiyue (百越). It is estimated that Yayoi people mainly belonged to Y-DNA Haplogroup O-M176 (O1b2) (today ~36%), Haplogroup O-M122 (O2, formerly O3) (today ~23%) and Haplogroup O-M119 (O1) (today ~4%), which are typical for East- and Southeast-Asians. Mitsuru Sakitani suggests that haplogroup O1b2, which is common in today Koreans, Japanese and some Manchu, and O1 are one of the carriers of Yangtze civilization. As the Yangtze civilization declined, several tribes crossed westward and northerly, to the Shandong peninsula, the Korean Peninsula and the Japanese archipelago. It is suggested that the linguistic homeland of Japonic is located somewhere in south-eastern or eastern China before the proto-Japanese migrated to the Korean Peninsula and the Japanese archipelago. According to linguist, Alexander Vovin, the urheimat of the Japonic languages may have been located in Southern China. Japanese linguist, Miyamoto Kazuo, instead has suggested a homeland further north in China, around modern Liaoning.

Ambassadorial visits to Japan by the later Chinese dynasties Wei and Jin recorded that the Wajin of Japan claimed to be descendants of Taibo of Wu, traditionally believed to be the founder of Wu. Several scholars in Japan suggested that the Yamato people and the Imperial House of Japan are descendants of the Wu and possibly Taibo. Many Japanese historians also link the early Japanese Yayoi people to the Baiyue tribes that also include the Wu people.

A Chinese legend of uncertain provenance states that Xu Fu, a Qin Dynasty court sorcerer, was sent by Qin Shi Huang to Penglai Mountain (Mount Fuji) in 219 BC to retrieve an elixir of life. Xu could not find any elixir of life and was reluctant to return to China because he knew he would be sentenced to death, Xu instead stayed in Japan. Other immigrants are also thought to include major population movements such as that of the Hata clan. The Hata clan claimed to be the descendants of Qin Shi Huang.

In 499 CE, a Chinese Buddhist missionary Hui Shen, paid visit to an island east of China known as Fusang, typically identified with modern-day Japan, which was described in the 7th-century Liang Shu.

Master Jianzhen came to Japan in 754 CE, he helped to propagate Buddhism in Japan and introduce the Vinaya with the establishment of Ritsu School. Emperor Shōmu and Empress Kōmyō received their ordination from him and he also established Tōshōdai-ji, he is also an important conductor of Chinese culture with the introduction of Traditional Chinese medicine, Chinese calligraphy and other Tang era cultural relics into Japan.

According to the Shinsen Shōjiroku (815), 176 Chinese aristocratic families lived in the Kinai area of Honshu, around the modern-day Kansai region. These immigrant clans were referred to as Toraijin (渡来人).

Sakanoue no Tamuramaro (坂上 田村麻呂, 758 – June 17, 811) was a court noble, general and shōgun of the early Heian period of Japan. According to the Shoku Nihongi, an official historical record, the Sakanoue clan is descended from Emperor Ling of Han China. The Sakanoue clan's family tree shows that Tamuramaro is a 14th-generation descendant of Ling.

During the Mongol invasions of China, many Chinese refugees fled to Japan. Some of these Chinese refugees became immensely powerful, for example, Mugaku Sogen, a Chinese Zen Buddhist who fled to Japan after the fall of the Song dynasty. After fleeing Japan, Mugaku Sogen became an advisor to the then ruler of Japan, Hōjō Tokimune.  The Chinese refugees who fled the Mongols warned the Japanese that the Mongols would also intend to invade Japan. Mugaku Sogen gave a bad report to Tokimune about the barbarity and cruelty of the Mongols after witnessing Mongol soldiers killing his fellow monks at a monastery. This encouraged Tokimune to not pay tribute to the Mongols as the emissaries Kublai Khan sent to Japan demanded, and instead resist the Mongols in their later attempted invasions of Japan. During the second Mongol invasion of Japan, many Chinese soldiers landed in Japan. After the Mongol defeat, the Japanese defenders killed all the Koreans, Mongols, and Jurchen soldiers they found, except for the Southern Chinese, who the Japanese felt had been coerced by the Mongols into joining the attack on Japan. The Southern Chinese soldiers were spared from being killed by the Japanese, but instead forced to become slaves.

During the Ming dynasty, Japan became decentralized without a central government and with many local daimyo reigning the country, in what would be called the Sengoku Period. Many of these daimyo encouraged Chinese immigration to Japan due to their skills and boost to the local economy. Many Chinese communities would be established in Japan, especially on the island of Kyushu. Many Chinese pirates would set up their bases in Japan in order to launch raid and attacks on mainland China as part of the wokou. For example, the powerful Chinese pirate, Wang Zhi, who became known as the "king of the wokou", established his base of operation in Japanese islands, in order to launch raids against the Ming government. Many of the Chinese pirates were supported by Japanese daimyo themselves.

Chinese people are also known to have settled in Okinawa during the Sanzan period at the invitation of the Ryukyuan kings; these were high level royal advisors who lived in the village of Kumemura, for example, claim to all be descended from Chinese immigrants.

During the Manchu conquest of China, many Chinese refugees would again flee to Japan to escape Manchu rule. For example, the Chinese scholar, Zhu Zhiyu, was one of the greatest scholars of Confucianism in the Ming dynasty and Edo Japan. Zhu remains the best remembered of the Ming political refugees in Tokugawa Japan and the one who contributed most to Japanese education and intellectual history.

One of the most well-known Chinese folk heroes was the Ming loyalist Koxinga, who conquered the island of Taiwan from the hands of the Dutch, in order to establish the Tungning Kingdom, the last remnant of the fallen Ming dynasty, where he could continue to fight against the Manchu invaders of China. Despite being a Chinese folk hero, Koxinga was actually born in Japan, to a Chinese merchant father and a Japanese mother. Koxinga is still worshiped as a folk deity, especially in Fujian and Taiwan.

Modern era 
During the Meiji and Taisho eras, it is estimated that up to 100,000 Chinese students came to study in Japan. Japan was both closer to China culturally and in distance than the American and European alternatives. It was also much cheaper. In 1906 alone, more than six thousand Chinese students were in Japan. Most of them resided in the district of Kanda in Tokyo.

Post-World War II 
The term shin-kakyō (新華僑) refers to people of Chinese descent who immigrated to Japan from Taiwan and mainland China.

Groups

Foreign students 
Many famous Chinese intellectuals and political figures have studied in Japan, among them Sun Yat-sen, Zhou Zuoren, Lu Xun, Zhou Enlai and Chiang Kai-shek.

Workers 
The industrial "training scheme" used to bring Chinese workers to Japan has been criticized by lawyers as exploitation, after several deaths.

Others 
Many Japanese war orphans left behind in China after World War II have migrated to Japan with the assistance of the Japanese government, bringing along their Chinese spouses and children.

Culture

Cuisine 

Chinese restaurants in Japan serve a fairly distinct style of Chinese cuisine. Though in the past Chinese cuisine would have been primarily available in Chinatowns such as those in port cities of Kobe, Nagasaki, or Yokohama, Japanese-style Chinese cuisine is now commonly available all over Japan. As Japanese restaurants often specialise in just one sort of dish, cuisine is focused primarily on dishes found within three distinct types of restaurants: ramen restaurants, dim sum houses, and standard Chinese-style restaurants.

Education

As of 2008 there are five Chinese day schools in Japan: two in Yokohama and one each in Kobe, Osaka, and Tokyo. Three are oriented towards the Republic of China on Taiwan while two are oriented towards mainland China. In Japanese the PRC-oriented schools are called tairiku-kei, and the ROC-oriented schools are taiwan-kei. The ROC-oriented schools teach Traditional Chinese and Bopomofo while the mainland-oriented schools teach Simplified Chinese and Hanyu Pinyin. The ROC-oriented schools, by 2008, also began teaching Simplified Chinese.As of 1995 most teachers at these schools are ethnic Chinese persons who were born in Japan. By that year there were increasing numbers of Japanese families sending their children to Chinese schools. Other students at Chinese schools are Japanese with mixed Chinese-Japanese parentage, Japanese children with Chinese parents, and returnees from abroad.

Sun Yat-sen established the Yokohama Chinese School in 1898. In 1952 it split into the mainland-aligned Yokohama Yamate Chinese School and the ROC-aligned Yokohama Overseas Chinese School. The Kobe Chinese School is also oriented towards mainland China. The Osaka Chinese School is located in Naniwa-ku, Osaka. There is also the Tokyo Chinese School.

Media
The Chūnichi Shinpo, a biweekly paper, is published in Chinese and Japanese. The Chūbun and Zhongwen Dabao, both weekly newspapers, and about 28 other Chinese newspapers are published in Tokyo. In addition the Kansai Kabun Jihō, published in Chinese and Japanese, is based in the Osaka area.

Issues

Ethnic relations 
During his time in office, former Tokyo governor Shintaro Ishihara publicly used controversial terms such as sangokujin to refer to Taiwanese Benshengren staying illegally in Japan, and implied that they might engage in rioting and looting in the aftermath of a disaster.

I referred to the "many sangokujin who entered Japan illegally." I thought some people would not know that word so I paraphrased it and used gaikokujin, or foreigners. But it was a newspaper holiday so the news agencies consciously picked up the sangokujin part, causing the problem.

... After World War II, when Japan lost, the Chinese of Taiwanese origin and people from the Korean Peninsula persecuted, robbed and sometimes beat up Japanese. It's at that time the word was used, so it was not derogatory. Rather we were afraid of them.

... There's no need for an apology. I was surprised that there was a big reaction to my speech. In order not to cause any misunderstanding, I decided I will no longer use that word. It is regrettable that the word was interpreted in the way it was.

Notable individuals
This is a list of Chinese expatriates in Japan and Japanese citizens of Chinese descent.

Before 20th century
 Koxinga or Zheng Chenggong, Prince of Yanping, Chinese Ming loyalist, founder of the House of Koxinga and the first ruler of the Kingdom of Tungning (currently Taiwan); born in Hirado, Hizen Province (currently Hirado, Nagasaki), son of a Chinese father (Zheng Zhilong) and a Japanese mother (Tagawa Matsu)

Early 20th century
 Chen Kenmin, Sichuan-born chef regarded as the "father of Sichuan cuisine" in Japan and father of Chen Kenichi (born in Yibin, Sichuan Province)
 Go Seigen, professional Go player (Real Name: Wu Qingyuan, born in Minhou County,  Fujian, China)
 Shosei Go, professional baseball player (born in Taiwan)

Late 20th century
 Momofuku Ando, founder of Nissin Foods, with Japanese Taiwan origins and ROC citizenship. (Born in Puzi, Chiayi County, Taiwan)
 Chen Kenichi, son of Chen Kenmin, also a Sichuan-style chef and longest-serving participant on Japanese cooking show Iron Chef (born in Tokyo, Japan)
 Chire Koyama, table tennis player, formerly known as He Zhili (born in Shanghai, China)
 Agnes Chan, pop singer, professor, and writer (born in Hong Kong)
 Lou Zhenggang, artist (born in Heilongjiang)
 Rissei Ō, professional Go player (born in Taiwan)
 O Meien, professional Go player (Real Name: Wang Ming-wan; born in Taipei, Taiwan)
 Sadaharu Oh, professional baseball player (Chinese Name: Wang Chen-chih; born in Sumida, Tokyo, Japan)
 Rin Kaiho, professional Go player (Chinese Name: Lin Haifeng; born in Shanghai, China)
 Cho U, professional Go player (Chinese Name: Chang Hsu; born in Taipei, Taiwan)
 Chin Shunshin, novelist (born in Kobe, Hyōgo Prefecture, Japan)
 Judy Ongg, actress, singer, author, and woodblock-print artist (born in Taipei, Taiwan) 
 Yinling, swimsuit model, race queen, singer and former professional wrestler (Real Name: Yan Yinling; born in Taipei, Taiwan]) 
 Kimiko Yo, award-winning Japanese actress of Republic of China nationality (born in Yokohama, Kanagawa)
 Takeshi Kaneshiro, actor, singer (born in Taipei, Taiwan; to Taiwanese mother)
 Reika Utsugi, softball player and manager of the Japan women's national softball team, formerly known as Ren Yanli

21st century
 Tsuyoshi Abe, actor and film director with mixed Chinese-Japanese ancestry
 Rola Chen, gravure idol (Real Name: Chen Yi, born in Hangzhou, Zhejiang)
 Mo Bangfu, author (born in Shanghai, China)
 Tomokazu Harimoto, naturalized table-tennis player, born to Chinese parents
 Lee Haku, volleyball player (born to Chinese parents)
 Leena, female model (immigrant; born in Tai'an, Shandong)
 Qian Lin & Li Chun, singers (Qian Lin: born in Hangzhou, Zhejiang/Li Chun: born in Yueyang, Hunan)
 Naomi Watanabe, comedian and actress (born in New Taipei City, Taiwan; to Taiwanese mother)
 Kaito Nakahori, composer (1/2 Chinese, 1/2 Japanese; born in Chiba Prefecture, Japan)
 Renhō, politician (born to a Taiwanese father)
 Emi Suzuki, female model (immigrant; born in Shanghai, China)
 Wei Son, female model (immigrant; born in Dalian, Liaoning)
 Zheng Yongshan, murderer (born in China)
 Hana Hishikawa, voice actress (1/2 Chinese, 1/2 Japanese; born in Tokyo, Japan)

See also 

 Japanese missions to Imperial China
 Japanese missions to Sui China
 Japanese missions to Tang China
 Japanese missions to Ming China
 Tokyo Mazu Temple
 Yokohama Ma Zhu Miao
 Kumemura
 Chinatown
 Chinatowns in Asia
 Yokohama Chinatown
 Kobe Chinatown
 Nagasaki Chinatown
 Ikebukuro Chinatown
 Anti-Japanese sentiment in China
 Anti-Chinese sentiment in Japan
 Japanese orphans in China
 Japanese people in China

Notes

References

Sources

Further reading
 Chen, Lara Tien-shi. "Chinese in Japan". Encyclopedia of Diasporas. Springer US, 2005, Part III, pp 680–688. DOI: 10.1007/978-0-387-29904-4 70. Print , Online .
 Le Bail, Hélène. "Skilled and Unskilled Chinese Migrants in Japan". (Archive). Les cahiers d’Ebisu. Occasional Papers No. 3, 2013, pp. 3–40. French Research Institute on Japan, Maison Franco-Japonaise (日仏会館).
 Shao, Chunfen. "Chinese Migration to Japan, 1978-2010: Patterns and Policies" (Part IV: Chinese Migration in Other Countries: Chapter 11). "A Biographical Study of Chinese Immigrants in Belgium: Strategies for Localisation". In: Zhang, Jijiao and Howard Duncan. Migration in China and Asia: Experience and Policy (Volume 10 of International Perspectives on Migration). Springer Science & Business Media, 8 April 2014. , 9789401787598. Start p. 175.

External links
 Naturalized Japanese
 Tokyo Chinese School
 Yokohama Overseas Chinese School
 Beech, Hannah (6 December 2007). "Chinese Immigrants Chase the Japanese Dream". Time.

 
 
 
Demographics of Japan
Ethnic groups in Japan
Racism in Japan
Immigration to Japan